Hywel Stoddart (born 1 April 1986) is a Welsh rugby union player. He is the brother of former Wales international rugby union player Morgan Stoddart. A flanker, Hywel Stoddart Llandovery, Tonmawr and Newport RFC. He made his debut for the Welsh regional team Newport Gwent Dragons 15 March 2012 versus Cardiff Blues as a second-half replacement. He was released by Newport Gwent Dragons at the end of the 2012–13 season.

References

External links 
 Newport RFC profile

Rugby union players from Pontypridd
Welsh rugby union players
Dragons RFC players
Newport RFC players
Living people
1986 births